Mohammad-Ali Rajai (15 June 1933 – 30 August 1981) was the second president of Iran from 2 to 30 August 1981 after serving as prime minister under Abolhassan Banisadr. He was also minister of foreign affairs from 11 March 1981 to 15 August 1981, while he was prime minister. He was assassinated in a bombing on 30 August 1981 along with prime minister Mohammad-Javad Bahonar.

Early life and education

Mohammad-Ali Rajai was born on 15 June 1933 in Qazvin, Iran. His father, a shopkeeper named Abdulsamad, died when he was 4 years old. Rajai grew up in Qazvin and moved to Tehran in the late 1940s. He joined the Air Force at age sixteen or seventeen. In 1959 he graduated from Tarbiat Moallem University with a degree in education. He worked as a teacher of mathematics.

Political career

Before the Islamic revolution
After moving to Tehran, Rajai became involved in the anti-Shah movement and was associated with Ayatollah Mahmoud Taleghani and the Fadaeian group. At one time a member of the largely anti-clerical People's Mujahedin of Iran (MKO), Rajai turned against its leftist orientation and in 1960 joined the Freedom Movement of Iran. He was arrested at least twice by the Shah's forces for his opposition activities and famously displayed his bare foot at the United Nations while describing being tortured by the Shah's interrogators. His longest detention extended from May 1974 to late 1978.

After the Islamic revolution
He was actively involved in the Iranian Revolution and was a leader in the movement to purge Iranian universities of American and European influences, which was later called the Cultural Revolution. Rajaei was appointed to important occupations after the victory of Islamic revolution. The occupations were as follow:
As the minister of Ministry of Education (Iran)
As the candidate of Islamic Consultative Assembly
As the prime minister
As the president

Ministry of Education

At the beginning, Gholam Hosein Shokohi was the minister of education, and Rajaei was one of his chancellors. After Shokohi's resigning due to illness, Muhammad Ali Rajaei was appointed as the supervisor of the ministry of education. He was introduced by Muhammad Javad Bahonar, and he became the supervisor of education ministry from 18th Shahrivar month to 7th Mehr at 1357 solar . Finally, Mehdi Bazargan presented him as the minister of education in his cabinet. His programs in the ministry of education included fair distribution of facilities, fair distribution of finance among staffs, reforming of centers of educating teachers, creating a suitable pedagogical system for Muslim society, developing of Islamic ethics among teachers and pupils, creating a good relation between parents and teachers and respect to dignity of teachers according to Islam. These schedules were very important for Rajaei, and he tried to realize them. He was in charge of the ministry for nine months. The most important achievements were the consistency of all schools and also trying to do away with discrimination and differences. He also tried to change the contents of educational books and also made attempts of Islamization of their contents.

Appointment as Prime Minister

In 1979, Rajai left the Freedom Movement. Following the Iranian Revolution, he was appointed minister of education in the government of Mehdi Bazargan, and although Bazargan's cabinet resigned on 6 November 1979, he did not resign and remained in the post until 12 August 1980 when he became prime minister. Following the presidency of Bani Sadr, after 5 months, he nominated Rajai for the position, and parliament voted him in. He appointed Khodapanahi as foreign minister, Mohammad-Reza Mahdavi Kani as interior minister and Javad Fakori as defense minister. During his prime ministership, the Iran–Iraq War started and his government's first policy became the "victory and defence". He was in office until 2 August 1981 when he became the second president of Iran.

Presidency
Bani Sadr was impeached on 22 June 1981 by parliament, and Khomeini held a Provisional Presidential Council by 6 people headed by Mohammad Beheshti and later Abdul-Karim Mousavi Ardebili. Rajai was one of the members of that Council. He nominated himself for the presidential election in 1981. He was the first president from the Islamic Republican Party after winning 91% of the votes. He officially became the president after the Oath of Office on 2 August 1981. He named Mohammad-Javad Bahonar to the Parliament to become the next prime minister. Parliament voted in to Bahonar and he formed a new government.

Assassination

On 30 August 1981, President Rajai held a meeting of Iran's Supreme Defence Council, along with the Prime Minister Mohammad Javad Bahonar. Witnesses later stated that a trusted aide brought a briefcase into the conference room, set it between the two leaders, and then left. Another person opened the case, triggering a bomb that set the room ablaze and killed Rajai, Bahonar, and three others. This attack occurred two months after the Hafte Tir bombing. The assassin was identified as Massoud Keshmiri, an operative of the People's Mujahedin of Iran (also known as the MKO, MEK and PMOI), who had infiltrated the Prime Minister's office in the guise of a state security official. Rajai was buried in Behesht-e Zahra.

Political positions
Rajai's political programs were based on a form of constitutional law that included a position of privilege for Islam. He insisted that those in control of the state must be Muslim, emphasized the Velayat-e Faqih, and believed it essential that the government cooperate with institutions such as the Islamic Revolutionary Guard and Islamic Revolutionary Court. He respected people's freedom insofar as it did not contravene Islamic law and tried during his tenure to create a consistent government.

References

External links

1933 births
1981 deaths
People from Qazvin
Freedom Movement of Iran MPs
People of the Iranian Revolution
Foreign ministers of Iran
Members of the 1st Islamic Consultative Assembly
Presidents of Iran
Prime Ministers of Iran
Islamic Republican Party politicians
Candidates in the July 1981 Iranian presidential election
Assassinated Iranian politicians
Assassinated heads of state
Burials at Behesht-e Zahra
Iranian revolutionaries
Deaths by explosive device
Iranian prisoners of war
Iranian torture victims
Islamic Association of Teachers of Iran politicians
People assassinated by the People's Mojahedin Organization of Iran
Early People's Mojahedin Organization of Iran members
Simple living advocates